Danielithosia hoenei is a moth of the family Erebidae. It is found in Cambodia, China (Hunan, Fujian), Thailand and Vietnam.

The length of the forewings is 7–9 mm for males and 8–10.5 mm for females. The forewings are light buff or yellow in males and grey or yellow with a lighter costal margin in females. The hindwings are light yellow in males and whitish or yellowish in females.

Etymology
The species is dedicated to Dr. Hermann Höne (1883–1963), a German entomologist, who collected in China and Japan in 1910–1938.

References

Moths described in 2013
Lithosiina